State Road 250 (SR 250) in the U.S. State of Indiana is a secondary route that runs from U.S. Route 50 (US 50) in Brownstown eastward toward the Ohio River at State Road 156 (SR 156) in Patriot in southeast Indiana. Towns include Uniontown, Paris Crossing, Canaan, and East Enterprise. SR 250 is split in two north of Madison due to the Big Oaks National Wildlife Refuge (formerly the Jefferson Proving Ground).

Route description
Most of the length of SR 250 is a rural two-lane highway.

Western section
SR 250 heads southeast from the western terminus in Brownstown towards State Road 39.  At the intersection with SR 39, SR 250 turns east.  Then SR 250 passes through an intersection with the southern terminus of the northern section of State Road 11 (SR 11).  SR 250 then passes through an intersection with U.S. Route 31 (US 31) and an interchange with Interstate 65 (I-65).  SR 250 heads east from I-65 and then has a concurrency with State Road 3.  Then SR 250 heads east from the concurrency with SR 3 towards the eastern terminus of the western section.  Then eastern terminus of this section is an intersection with State Road 7.

Eastern section
The eastern section begins at an intersection with U.S. Route 421.  SR 250 has a concurrency with State Road 62.  Then SR 250 leaves the concurrency with SR 62 and then passes through intersections with State Road 129 and State Road 56.  SR 250 then has an intersection with SR 156, this intersection is the eastern terminus of SR 250.

History
SR 250 has a western section that went from US 50 toward State Road 37 in Mitchell.

Major intersections

References

External links

250
Transportation in Jackson County, Indiana
Transportation in Jefferson County, Indiana
Transportation in Jennings County, Indiana
Transportation in Switzerland County, Indiana